517th may refer to:

517th Air Defense Group, disbanded United States Air Force organization
517th Airlift Squadron (517 AS), part of the 3d Wing at Elmendorf Air Force Base, Alaska
517th Parachute Infantry Regiment (United States) (517th PIR), separate infantry regiment of the United States Army
517th Parachute Regimental Combat Team (517th PRCT), one of the U.S. Army's first elite combat units
517th Strategic Fighter Squadron, inactive United States Air Force unit

See also
517 (number)
517, the year 517 (DXVII) of the Julian calendar
517 BC